The 2015 Suzhou Ladies Open was a professional tennis tournament played on outdoor hard courts. It was the fourth edition of the tournament and part of the 2015 ITF Women's Circuit, offering a total of $50,000 in prize money. It took place in Suzhou, China, on 19–25 October 2015.

Singles main draw entrants

Seeds 

 1 Rankings as of 12 October 2015

Other entrants 
The following players received wildcards into the singles main draw:
  Wang Yan
  Xu Shilin
  You Xiaodi
  Yuan Yi

The following players received entry from the qualifying draw:
  Silvia Njirić
  Chantal Škamlová
  Wei Zhanlan
  Zhang Ling

Champions

Singles

 Zhang Kailin def.  Duan Yingying, 1–6, 6–3, 6–4

Doubles

 Yang Zhaoxuan /  Zhang Yuxuan def.  Tian Ran /  Zhang Kailin, 7–6(7–4), 6–2

External links 
 2015 Suzhou Ladies Open at ITFtennis.com

2015 ITF Women's Circuit
2015 in Chinese tennis
2015